Amalda mucronata is a species of medium-sized sea snail, a marine gastropod mollusc in the family Ancillariidae. These snails live in the sandy subtidal near-shore environment where they eat bivalves. Fossil material of this species provides evidence of morphological stasis over 5 million years

Shell description
The shell height is up to 61 mm, and the width is up to 27 mm.

Distribution
This marine species is endemic to and occurs off New Zealand.

References

 Sowerby G.B. I (1830). Species Conchylirum or concise original descriptions and accompanied by figures of all the species of Recent shells, with their varieties. G.B. Sowerby, London.
 Powell A W B, New Zealand Mollusca, William Collins Publishers Ltd, Auckland, New Zealand 1979 
 Glen Pownall, New Zealand Shells and Shellfish, Seven Seas Publishing Pty Ltd, Wellington, New Zealand 1979

External links
 Massey University NZ Fauna Scanned 3D model of Amalda mucronata fossil

mucronata
Gastropods of New Zealand
Gastropods described in 1830
Taxa named by George Brettingham Sowerby I